Badakhshan Province (Persian , Badaxšān) is one of the 34 provinces of Afghanistan, located in the northeastern part of the country. It is bordered by Tajikistan's Gorno-Badakhshan in the north and the Pakistani regions of Lower and Upper Chitral and Gilgit-Baltistan in the southeast. It also has a 91-kilometer (57-mile) border with China in the east.

It is part of a broader historical Badakhshan region, parts of which now also lie in Tajikistan and China. The province contains 22 districts, over 1,200 villages and approximately 1 055 000  people. Fayzabad serves as the provincial capital. Resistance activity has been reported in the province since the 2021 Taliban takeover of Afghanistan.

Etymology 
Badakhshan's name comes from the Middle Persian word "badaxš", which is an official title. The word "ān" is a suffix which demonstrates a place's name; therefore the word "badaxšān" means a place belonging to a person called "badaxš".

During the Sassanids' reign it was called "bidix", and in Parthian times "bthšy". In Sassanid manuscripts found in Ka'ba-ye Zartosht it was called "Bałasakan". In Chinese sources from the 7th century onwards it was called "Po-to-chang-na".

Geography

Badakhshan is bordered by Takhar Province to the west, Panjshir Province to the south west, Nuristan Province to the south, Tajikistan to the north and east (that nation's Gorno-Badakhshan Autonomous Province and Khatlon Province), China through a long spur called the Wakhan Corridor to the east, and Pakistan to the south-east (Chitral and Gilgit-Baltistan).

According to the World Wildlife Fund, Badakhshan contains temperate grasslands, savannas, and shrublands, as well as Gissaro-Alai open woodlands along the Pamir River. Common plants found in these areas include pistachio, almond, walnut, apple, juniper, and sagebrush.

Montane grasslands and shrublands are existent in the province, with the Hindu Kush alpine meadow in the high mountains in the northern and southwestern regions.

The Wakhan corridor contains two montane grassland and shrubland regions: the Karakoram-West Tibetan Plateau alpine steppe and in the Pamir Mountains and Kuh-e Safed Khers in Darwaz region.

South of Fayzabad the terrain becomes dominated by deserts and xeric shrublands. Common vegetation includes thorny bushes, zizyphus, acacia, and Amygdatus.
Paropamisus xeric woodlands can be found in the province's northwestern and central areas. Common vegetation includes almond, pistachio, willows, and sea-buckthorn.

History

Badakhshan etymologically derives from the Middle Persian word badaxš, an official title. The suffix of the name, -ān, means the region belonged to someone with the title badaxš.

The territory was ruled by the Uzbek Khanate of Bukhara between the early 16th century and the mid-18th century. It was given to Ahmad Shah Durrani by Murad Beg of Bukhara after a treaty of friendship was reached in or about 1750 and became part of the Durrani Empire. It was ruled by the Durranis followed by the Barakzai dynasty, and was untouched by the British during the three Anglo-Afghan Wars that were fought in the 19th and 20th centuries. It remained peaceful for about 100 years until the 1980s Soviet–Afghan War at which point the Mujahideen began a rebellion against the central Afghan government.

During the 1990s, much of the area was controlled by forces loyal to Burhanuddin Rabbani and Ahmad Shah Massoud, who were de facto the national government until 1996. Badakhshan was the only province that the Taliban did not conquer during their rule from 1996 to 2001. However, during the course of the wars a non-Taliban Islamic emirate was established in Badakhshan by Mawlawi Shariqi, paralleling the Islamic Revolutionary State of Afghanistan in neighboring Nuristan. Rabbani, a Badakhshan native, and Massoud were the last remnants of the anti-Taliban Northern Alliance during the peak of Taliban control in 2001.

Badakhshan was thus one of the few provinces of the country that witnessed little insurgency in the Afghan wars – however, during the 2010s Taliban insurgents managed to attack and take control of several districts in the province.

On 26 October 2015, the 7.5 Mw Hindu Kush earthquake shook northern Afghanistan with a maximum Mercalli intensity of VIII (Severe). This earthquake destroyed almost 30,000 homes, left several hundred dead, and more than 1,700 injured.

Transportation

Fayzabad Airport serves the province with regular direct flights to Kabul.

Healthcare

The percentage of households with clean drinking water increased from 13% in 2005 to 21% in 2011.
The percentage of births attended to by a skilled birth attendant increased from 1.5% in 2003 to 2% in 2011.

Education

Badakhshan University is located in Fayzabad, a city which also has a number of public schools including an all-girls school.

The overall literacy rate (6+ years of age) fell from 31% in 2005 to 26% in 2011. The overall net enrolment rate (6–13 years of age) increased from 46% in 2005 to 68% in 2011.

Economy

Despite massive mineral reserves, Badakhshan is one of the most destitute areas in the world. Opium poppy growing is the only real source of income in the province and Badakhshan has one of the highest rates of maternal mortality in the world, due to the complete lack of health infrastructure, inaccessible locations, and bitter winters of the province.

Lapis lazuli has been mined in the Sar-e-Sang mines, located in the Kuran wa Munjan District of Badakhshan, for over 6,000 years. The mines were the largest and most well-known source in ancient times. Most recent mining activity has focused on lapis lazuli, with the proceeds from the lapis mines being used to fund Northern Alliance troops, and before that, anti-Soviet Mujahideen fighters. Recent geological surveys have indicated the location of other gemstone deposits, in particular rubies and emeralds. It is estimated that the mines at Kuran wa Munjan District hold up to 1,290 tonnes of azure (lapis lazuli). Exploitation of this mineral wealth could be key to the region's prosperity.

On 5 October 2018 in Washington, D.C., Afghan officials signed a 30-year contract involving a $22 million investment by investment group Centar and its operating company, Afghan Gold and Minerals Co., to explore and develop an area of Badakhshan for gold mining.

Sport

The province is represented in Afghan domestic cricket competitions by the Badakhshan Province cricket team BORNA Cricket Club which belongs to BORNA Institute of Higher Education is coming up with its own team and will be groomed by the experts in the field of cricket.

Demographics

As of 2020, the population of the province is about 1,054,087, constituting a multi-ethnic rural society. Dari-speaking Tajiks make up the majority followed by a few Uzbeks, Hazaras, Pashtuns, Kyrgyz, Qizilbash, and others. There are also speakers of the following Pamiri languages: Shughni, Munji, Ishkashimi, and Wakhi.

The inhabitants of the province are mostly Sunni Muslims, although there are also some Ismaili Shias.

60.1% of the population lived below the national poverty line, one of the higher figures in the country.

Districts

Notable people from Badakhshan

 Makhfi Badakhshi, Persian poetess, lived and died in Badakhshan
 Nūr al-Dīn Jaʿfar Badakhshī, 14th-century disciple of the eminent Central Asian Ṣūfī shaykh Sayyid ʿAlī Hamadānī
 Mullah Shah Badakhshi, 17th-century Muslim Sufi of the Qadiri order, from Araska in Rustaq area in Badakhshan
 Tahir Badakhshi, political activist
 Nāsir Khusraw Qubādiyānī Balkhi, 11th-century Persian poet, philosopher and Isma'ili scholar, died in Yamgan, Badakhshan
 Bairam Khan, 16th-century important military commander, and later commander-in-chief of the Mughal army, a powerful statesman and regent at the court of the Mughal Emperors, Humayun and Akbar
 Fawzia Koofi, noted Afghan women's rights activist, member of Parliament and 2014 presidential candidate
 Ustad Ahmad Lahauri, Chief architect of the Taj Mahal
 Miri Maftun, Afghan musician from Badakhshan.
 Zulmai Mujadidi, Member of Parliament representing Badakhshan
 Latif Pedram, political activist and candidate for Afghanistan's presidency
 Burhanuddin Rabbani, leader of the Jamiat-e Islami political party and former president of Afghanistan
Qari Fasihuddin, Army Chief, Islamic Emirate of Afghanistan

See also
Dorah Pass
Gorno-Badakhshan Autonomous Region

References

Further reading
 Burhanuddin Kushkaki. Rāhnamā-yi Qaṭaghan va Badakhshān. Kabul: Vizarat-i Ḥarbiyah, 1923.
 Jan-Heeren Grevemeyer: Herrschaft, Raub und Gegenseitigkeit: Die politische Geschichte Badakhshans 1500–1883, Otto Harrassowitz, Wiesbaden 1982
 Wolfgang Holzwarth: Segmentation und Staatsbildung in Afghanistan: Traditionale sozio-politische Organisation in Badakhshan, Wakhan und Sheghnan In: Berliner Institut für vergleichende Sozialforschung [Red.: Kurt Greussing u. Jan-Heeren Grevemeyer] (Hrsg.): Revolution in Iran und Afghanistan – mardom nameh – Jahrbuch zur Geschichte und Gesellschaft des Mittleren Orients Syndikat, Frankfurt am Main 1980, .

External links
 
 Badkhshan Province – Ministry of Rural Rehabilitation and Development

 
Provinces of Afghanistan
Provinces of the Islamic Republic of Afghanistan